Lovnik is a small settlement on the western slopes of Mount Boč in the Municipality of Poljčane in northeastern Slovenia. The area is part of the traditional region of Styria. It is now included with the rest of the municipality in the Drava Statistical Region.

References

External links
Lovnik on Geopedia

Populated places in the Municipality of Poljčane